Yarra Creek is a rural locality in the local government area of King Island on King Island in Bass Strait, north of Tasmania. The 2016 census determined a population of 36 for the state suburb of Yarra Creek.

History
The farming community of Yarra Creek was established as part of the Soldier Settlement Scheme after World War II.

Geography
Bass Strait forms the eastern boundary.

Road infrastructure
The C202 route enters from the west as Yarra Creek Road and runs to the village of Yarra Creek in the centre, where it turns north as Millwood Road before exiting.

References

King Island (Tasmania)
Towns in Tasmania